Matthew Day  (born 28 September 1971) is an Australian actor and filmmaker.

Early life
Day was born in Melbourne, Victoria. When he was 11 years old, he went to live in the United States with his father, a newspaper correspondent, where he became interested in acting. On his return to Australia, he attended Princes Hill Secondary College, in Carlton North and joined St Martins Youth Arts Centre in South Yarra.

Career
Day was spotted by an agent at the age of 14 and was soon cast in his first role in the ABC television series c/o The Bartons. At 17, he left his home in Carlton and relocated to Sydney for the role in the television series A Country Practice that was to be his first big break.

He has since gone on to establish a reputation as one of Australia's leading film, television and theatre actors, appearing in numerous Australian television series and telemovies including Rake, Tangle, Hell Has Harbour Views, My Brother Jack and Paper Giants: The Birth of Cleo. Feature credits include Touch, My Year Without Sex,  Love and Other Catastrophes, Muriel's Wedding, Woody Allen's Scoop, and Kiss or Kill, for which he received nominations for a Film Critic Circle Award and an AFI Award for Best Actor. 
His international television credits include Shackleton with Kenneth Branagh, The Hound of the Baskervilles, The Commander, Spooks, Hotel Babylon, Secret Diary of a Call Girl and Bruce Beresford's And Starring Pancho Villa as Himself.

Short films as writer/director include Beat (2011 St Kilda Film Festival) My Everything (2003 Toronto Short Film Festival) and Wish (Turner Classic Shorts 2008 Winner - Special Mention, London Film Festival, Encounters Short Film Festival, Foyle Film Festival, Edinburgh International Film Festival, Stockholm Film Festival).

In 2017 he won the 25th Tropfest short film festival for his comic short film The Mother situation, which he both directed and acted in.

Personal life
Day's parents divorced when he was young.  His mother, an English teacher, took him around Europe for six months when he was 7 and his brother Michael was 9. He said later that "the whole experience went definitely some way to influencing my wanderlust".

Day moved with his wife, journalist Kirsty Thomson, to London in 2000, not returning to Australia until 2007. The couple now live in Sydney and have two sons, Jackson and Rufus.

Filmography

Feature films
Muriel's Wedding (1994) - Brice Nobes
Love and Other Catastrophes (1996) - Michael Douglas
Dating the Enemy (1996) - Rob
Kiss or Kill (1997) - Al Fletcher
The Two-Wheeled Time Machine (1997, Short) - Henry Howard
Doing Time for Patsy Cline (1997) - Ralph
The Sugar Factory (1998) - Harris
Muggers (2000) - Brad Forrest
Scoop (2006) - Jerry Burke
My Year Without Sex (2009) - Ross
Dawn (2014) - John
Touch (2015)
Dance Academy: The Movie (2017) - Barrister Jeff Menzies
Sweet Country (2017) - Judge Taylor
Reaching Distance (2018) - Martin

Television

c/o The Bartons (1988) - Paul Barton
House Rules (1988)
A Country Practice (1989–1993) - Julian 'Luke' Ross
The Bob Morrison Show (1994) - Jake Duffy
Snowy River: The McGregor Saga (1995) - Pete Reilly
The Beast (1996) - Cosgrove
Water Rats (1996) - Matthews
Farscape (2000) - Councilor Tyno
The Love of Lionel's Life (2000, TV Movie) - Lionel
My Brother Jack (2001, TV Movie) - David Meredith
The Green-Eyed Monster (2001, TV Movie) - Liam McGuire
The Hound of the Baskervilles (2002, TV Movie) - Sir Henry Baskerville
Shackleton (2002) - Frank Hurley
And Starring Pancho Villa as Himself (2003, TV Movie) - John Reed
Wild Down Under (2003) - Narrator
Hell Has Harbour Views (2005, TV Movie) - Hugh Walker
Hotel Babylon (2006) - Richard
Spooks (2006) - Neil Sternin
The Commander (2007, TV Movie) - Eric Thornton
The Informant (2008, TV Movie) - Cameron Clifford
Tangle (2009–2010) - Gabriel Lucas
Underbelly: The Golden Mile (2010) - Sid Hillier
Rake (2010–2018) - David Potter
Paper Giants: The Birth of Cleo (2011) - Daniel Ritchie
Miss Fisher's Murder Mysteries (2012) in "King  Memses' Curse" (S1:E13)
The Outlaw Michael Howe (2013, TV Movie) - Magistrate Robert Knopwood
Love Child (2017) - Father Ross
Wolf Creek (2017) - Brian
Les Norton (2019) - Gecko
Get Krack!n (2019) - Brendan O'Hara
The Unusual Suspects (2021) - Garth

Stage
Black Rabbit, Playbox Theatre Company
The Game of Love and Chance, New England Theatre Company
Man of the Moment, Ensemble Productions Theatre, Sydney
Six Degrees of Separation, Sydney Theatre Company, Sydney, 1998.
Fred, Sydney Theatre Company, Sydney, 1999.
Scarlett O'Hara at the Crimson Parrot, Arts Centre Playhouse, Melbourne, 2008.
The Wonderful World of Dissocia, Sydney Theatre Company, Sydney, 2009.
North By Northwest, Melbourne Theatre Company, Melbourne, 2015.

References

External links

Matt Day Yahoo Group Tons of Photos and Breaking News

1971 births
Australian male film actors
Australian male television actors
Living people
Male actors from Melbourne